Falling Water or Fallingwater may refer to:

 Falling Water (TV series), a TV series on the USA Network
 Fallingwater, a house in Pennsylvania designed by Frank Lloyd Wright
 Fallingwater (composition), a concerto inspired by the house in Pennsylvania designed by Frank Lloyd Wright
 Fallingwater (album), a 2005 Swedish album
 "Fallingwater" (song), 2018 single by Maggie Rogers
 Falling Water, Tennessee, a census-designated place and unincorporated community in Hamilton County, Tennessee
 Falling Water River,  Putnam County, Tennessee

See also
 Falling Waters (disambiguation)
 Waterfall